Ignacio Gariglio (born 25 April 1998) is an Argentine professional footballer who plays as a centre-back for Arsenal de Sarandí, on loan from Estudiantes.

Career
Gariglio started with Deportivo Mac Allister before joining Estudiantes; initially on loan. He signed his first pro contract on 30 June 2019, having previously been injured for one year due to a trapped vein in his left leg. In October 2020, Gariglio was loaned to fellow Primera División club Arsenal de Sarandí. After going unused on the bench for Copa de la Liga Profesional matches with Unión Santa Fe and Atlético Tucumán (twice) in November, Gariglio made his debut on 5 December in the same competition against Racing Club; replacing Jhonatan Candia for the final seven minutes of a win.

Career statistics
.

Notes

References

External links

1998 births
Living people
People from Santa Rosa, La Pampa
Argentine people of Italian descent
Argentine footballers
Association football defenders
Argentine Primera División players
Estudiantes de La Plata footballers
Arsenal de Sarandí footballers